Indianapolis Woman was a monthly magazine published in Indianapolis, USA, that covered issues of interest to women.

History and profile
Indianapolis Woman Magazine was started as a monthly by C. E. Publishing in September 1984. The founding publishers were Connie Rosenthal and Linda Eder. It carried articles on shopping, cooking and decorating targeting women in Indianapolis. 

The magazine was acquired by the Weiss Communications Inc. in 1994. It was a free publication with Shari Finnell as the editor-in-chief, and was published monthly by the company until April 2012.

References

1984 establishments in Indiana
2012 disestablishments in Indiana
Defunct women's magazines published in the United States
Free magazines
Lifestyle magazines published in the United States
Magazines established in 1984
Magazines disestablished in 2012
Magazines published in Indianapolis
Monthly magazines published in the United States
Women in Indiana